48th parallel may refer to:

48th parallel north, a circle of latitude in the Northern Hemisphere
48th parallel south, a circle of latitude in the Southern Hemisphere